Pedro Sousa was the defending champion but lost in the first round to Christian Garín.

Salvatore Caruso won the title after defeating Garín 7–5, 6–4 in the final.

Seeds

Draw

Finals

Top half

Bottom half

References
Main Draw
Qualifying Draw

Città di Como Challenger - Singles
2018 Singles